Dopefish may refer to:
 Dopefish, an enemy originally from the 1991 video game Commander Keen in Goodbye, Galaxy (part of the Commander Keen series), since described as one of the video game industry's biggest in-jokes
 DJ Dopefish